The Cook Islands maintains diplomatic relations with various countries and is a member of multilateral organisations. While the country is in free association with New Zealand, which can act on the Cook Islands' "delegated authority [...] to assist the Cooks Islands" in foreign affairs, the Cook Islands nevertheless enters into treaty obligations and otherwise "interacts with the international community as a sovereign and independent state."

History 
In the 1980s the Cook Islands became a member of several United Nations specialized agencies: the World Health Organization in 1984, the Food and Agriculture Organization and UNESCO in 1985, and the International Civil Aviation Organization in 1986. The Repertory of Practice of United Nations Organs records that in 1988 New Zealand declared "that its future participation in international agreements would no longer extend to the Cook Islands..." In 1991 the Cook Islands became a full member of the United Nations Conference on Environment and Development (UNCED) Preparatory Committee and the Intergovernmental Negotiating Committee for a Framework Convention on Climate Change (INC), which the Repertory of Practice describes as "further evidence that the international community had accepted the Cook Islands as a “State” under international law." The United Nations Secretariat therefore "recognized the full treaty-making capacity of the Cook Islands" in 1992 and the Secretary-General, in his capacity as the depository of multilateral treaties, decided that the Cook Islands could participate in treaties that were open to "all states".

Diplomatic relations 
 states. In 2000 the Cook Islands government signed the Cotonou Partnership Agreement between the European Union and African, Caribbean and Pacific Group of States (ACP).

Upon signature of this agreement the Cook Islands Government established a representation to the EU in Brussels. In 2002 this representation was upgraded to a full diplomatic mission with accreditation to the European Union. The establishment of this mission marked an important development in Cook Islands international relations representing the first full diplomatic mission established by the Cook Islands outside of Pacific countries.

The following countries have established formal diplomatic relations with the Cook Islands.

Oceania

 1994
  1998     
 3 September 2013
 3 September 2013
 24 September 2014
 1994
 1993
 2013
 3 September 2013
 1995
  2013
 2013
 18 November 2014
 2013
 30 July 1980 or 2013

Europe

   6 April 2005
  12 May 2008
  25 October 2018
 2001 
  2000
  March 2001
       22 October 2018
  29 April 1999
 13 October 2017
 21 November 2022
  21 February 2002
 18 May 2015
 6 October 2017 
 16 August 2011
  18 July 1991 
  12 August 1995
  29 January 1998
 7 March 2011 
 20 October 2008

Asia

  25 July 1997
  1998; see Cook Islands–India relations
 12 July 2019
 April 2008
 16 June 2011
   8 December 2021
  2 May 1992
 12 December 2011
 6 August 2012
 22 February 2013
   April 2005
 17 August 2002
 5 August 2018
 26 April 2022

Americas

 9 November 2017
 21 August 2015
 3 August 2016 or before
  2 September 2002
  14 May 2003
 September 2017
 In 2022, Joe Biden signaled an intention to recognize the Cook Islands and Niue as sovereign states as part of a larger strategy for foreign policy in the Pacific.

Africa

 9 February 1996

Consular relations

The following countries have established consular relations with the Cook Islands only.
 2007 or before
 2016 or before
 22 February 1995 or before

International organisation participation 

 ACP, AOSIS, AsDB, ESCAP (associate), FAO, ICAO, IMO, ICC, ICFTU, IFAD, ILO IOC, OPCW, Pacific Islands Forum, Red Cross/Red Crescent, South Pacific Applied Geoscience Commission, Sparteca, SPC, UNESCO, WHO, WMO
 Commonwealth of Nations – the Cook Islands are part of the Commonwealth, but is not a member state, being a dependency of New Zealand, whose Commonwealth membership covers the Cook Islands, Niue, and Tokelau, as well as New Zealand itself.
 In November 2011, the Cook Islands were one of the eight founding members of Polynesian Leaders Group, a regional grouping intended to cooperate on a variety of issues including culture and language, education, responses to climate change, and trade and investment.
The Cook Islands participate in the International Maritime Organization, the United Nations regulatory body for the shipping trade.

Participation in international treaties and conventions 

 Party to the following treaties and conventions: Biodiversity Convention, Cotonou Agreement, Geneva Conventions, POPs Project, United Nations Convention to Combat Desertification, UNCLOS, UNFCCC and its Kyoto protocol, Convention on the Recognition and Enforcement of Foreign Arbitral Awards, Comprehensive Nuclear-Test-Ban Treaty, International Code of Conduct against Ballistic Missile Proliferation, Biological Weapons Convention, Convention of the International Mobile Satellite Organization

See also

 List of diplomatic missions of the Cook Islands
 List of diplomatic missions in the Cook Islands
 Foreign relations of Niue
 Foreign relations of New Zealand
 Politics of the Cook Islands

Notes

References

External links 

 Cook Islands Ministry of Foreign Affairs and Immigration
 Cook Islands analysis
 The Cook Islands’ unique constitutional and international status
 Cook Islands Representatives Overseas 2006
 Diplomatic Relations List 2011

 
Cook Islands and the Commonwealth of Nations